Scottish Rail Holdings is an executive non-departmental public body of the Scottish Government. It is the owner of ScotRail, the company which operates the majority of rail services in Scotland, which has been in public ownership since 1 April 2022. As operator of last resort, Scottish Rail Holdings exists to provide a degree of separation between the day to operation of ScotRail, and the strategic and policy functions of Transport Scotland.

Scottish Rail Holdings will take over the operation of the Caledonian Sleeper service from Serco on 25 June 2023.

References

External links

Executive non-departmental public bodies of the Scottish Government
2022 establishments in Scotland
Organisations based in Glasgow
Rail transport in Scotland